Aireon is an American company based in McLean, Virginia. Founded in 2011, it manufactures, deploys, and operates a global aircraft tracking and surveillance system utilizing satellite-based receivers to monitor the existing ADS-B transmissions of aircraft, for global air traffic surveillance.

History
Aireon was launched in 2011 as a joint venture between satellite communications company Iridium Communications Inc, Nav Canada, NATS, ENAV, Naviair and the Irish Aviation Authority to work on a surveillance system to track aircraft around the globe, beyond the range of ground-based radar and ADS-B receivers, in real time. Nav Canada invested $150 million to acquire a 51% stake in the project.

In September 2016, Aireon launched a partnership with FlightAware to provide space-based ADS-B to airlines and other aircraft operators with Qatar Airways as the launch customer.

In January 2017, Aireon launched and deployed its first ADS-B payloads on Iridium Next satellites. Seven launches followed the first launch. The eighth and final launch in January 2019 completed the satellite 'constellation' and put the total in-orbit Aireon payloads at 75 (66 operational payloads and 9 spares).  

National ANSPs including Nav Canada, UK NATS, ENAV, IAA, AAI, Naviair, Isavia, CAAS of Singapore, ATNS of South Africa, DC-ANSP, ASECNA, Seychelles (SCAA), COCESNA Honduras and PNG of Papua New Guinea have signed a Data Services Agreement with Aireon.

Technology
ADS-B-equipped aircraft transmit short data packets containing identification, position and other information. The system was intended to be used with ground-based receivers. Through its receivers in space, Aireon monitors these transmissions, providing coverage where there is no ground infrastructure, relaying signals from all ADS-B equipped aircraft to controllers.

Iridium Communications hosts the Aireon payloads on its constellation of Iridium NEXT low-orbiting communication satellites.

Aireon's receiver data is also processed by FlightAware which has partnered with Aireon to provide data to airlines, other aircraft operators, and the public.

References

External links

Companies based in McLean, Virginia